Paul Hatch (born 1969, Lichfield, United Kingdom) is a British industrial designer and is the founder / CEO of TEAMS Design USA, a global product design consultancy. Together with management consultant Kearney, Hatch also co-founded PERlab, a division of Kearney.

History
Hatch graduated in 1993 with a bachelor's degree in industrial design from Northumbria University. He went to work for TEAMS Design GmbH in Esslingen in 1994. In 1998 he was tasked with opening Teams Design's first satellite office in Chicago, Illinois. He is regularly invited to lecture at various universities and organizations both locally and internationally. Hatch served his local design colleagues as the Industrial Designers Society of America (IDSA) Midwest District Vice-President from 2004–2006. During that time period, he organized three district conferences for IDSA.

Hatch was the elected conference chair for the 2013 IDSA International Conference in Chicago called "Breaking the Rules". In April 2009, Hatch was the third design professional ever to be awarded the IDSA Midwest Honors for Outstanding Achievement. Hatch is also regularly invited to lecture students at colleges and universities across the US. Hatch recently finished up serving as the IDSA Director of Conference Experience and sat on the Board of Directors.

Hatch is the co-founder of the non-profit organization "Design House" (founded 2012)  whose mission is to revitalize local manufacture through design". Together with Pam Daniels and Susan Page Estes he created a process in which idea generation at public "Design Jam" events would help diversify the portfolios of selected local manufacturers, with the goal to bolster their longevity. This method differed from traditional design idea generation in that it started with the specialisms and constraints of the selected manufacturers, rather than starting with an idea and then finding a manufacturer. The latter option often leads to outsourcing offshore manufacturing, which was the issue this method addressed. The initial Design Jams were hosted in Hatch's hometown of Chicago but then spread to other cities seeking restabilization of the local industries, including San Francisco, Detroit, St. Louis, Pittsburgh, and Cincinnati. In 2015 Hatch and Estes were invited to the White House by Penny Pritzker and the Barack Obama administration as part of discussions on how to revitalize local manufacture.

Hatch is also the founder of "Fight Club" (2002-2013), an open public debate event that took place in darkened warehouses, where two experts ("fighters") would debate within a chalk circle, surrounded by the standing audience ("The crowd"). Like the namesake movie Fight Club, there were "no rules" to the debate and the audience could interject at any time. This provided for an intense, open debate of a range of subjects such as the death penalty, censorship, the legalization of marijuana, and human cloning. One "fight" got featured on ABC (American Broadcasting Company), which led to shooting a pilot for a television series. The New York Times called the non-holds barred event a "Designer Slugfest".

In 2018 Hatch was one of two people inducted into the IDSA Academy of Fellows, the IDSA's Designer Hall of Fame that includes designers such as Raymond Loewy, Henry Dreyfuss, Bill Moggridge, Niels Diffrient, and Jay Doblin.

Personal life
Hatch currently resides in Chicago, Illinois with his wife Jacqueline and his two sons.  He met his wife while working in Germany. Hatch is involved in various community volunteer projects and still contributes to the IDSA and the local design community.

Design Awards
iF Product Design Awards
2010 Mr. Coffee Optimal Brew Thermal Coffeemaker,
ID Magazine Annual Design Review
2010 Robert Bosch Full Force Pneumatic Nail Guns
Appliance Design EID Awards
2010 Federal Signal Automated Parking Products Universal One & Universal PS
2010 Robert Bosch Full Force Pneumatic Nail Guns
2010 Sunbeam Products Flat Panel Heater

Appliance Design EID Awards
2011 Silver Award Business Machine – HoMedics Inc. Black & Decker Hanging Crosscut 6-Sheet Paper Shredder
2011 Silver Award Small Appliances – Robert Bosch Corp., 12" Dual-Bevel Glide Miter Saw
2011 Silver Award Small Appliances – HoMedics Inc., Black & Decker iShred
2011 Bronze Award Small Appliances – Jarden Consumer Solutions, Mr. Coffee Optimal Brew Thermal Coffeemaker* 2009 Robert Bosch RS35 Reciprocating Saw
2010 Silver Award – Federal Signal Automated Parking Products Universal One & Universal PS
2010 Silver Award – Robert Bosch Full Force Pneumatic Nail Guns
2010 Bronze Award – Sunbeam Products Flat Panel Heater
 2009 Argus Camera Company Kid's Cameras Bean and Sprout
IHA Awards
 2009 Wusthof-Trident Precision Edge Electric Knife Sharpener
 2009 Smith's Edge Diamond Edge Electric Knife and Scissors Sharpener
ADEX Awards
 2008 Mansfield Reo Bathroom Suite
 2008 Mansfield Essence Bathroom Suite
Good Design Award
 2009 Robert Bosch Pneumatic Nailers
 2009 RS35 Demolition Reciprocating Saw
 2009 Precise Path Robotics RG3 Robotic Greens Mower
 2008 Argus Camera Kid's Cameras Bean and Sprout
 2005 LR Nelson Costco 3 Piece Nozzle Set
Design of the Decade (IDSA /BusinessWeek)
 2000 Karcher Full Line of Power Washers
I.D. Magazine
 2000 Siemens Easy Control Climate Control Unit
IDEA
 2009 Argus Bean Children's Digital Camera
Spark Award Bronze
Precise Path RG3 Mower
iF Product Design Awards
 2001 Karcher HDS 698 CSX Heated Pressure Washer
 2000 Siemens Easy Control Climate Control Unit
Red Star Design Awards

References

 Hatch, Paul (editor); McDonagh,Deana (editor); Balte, Tatyana (illustrator) (2006). REALIZE – Design Means Business, Industrial Designers Society of America; 1ST edition, 
 McDonagh, Deana, (2005). IMPACT: The Synergy of Design, Technology, and Business, Industrial Designers Society of America; 1ST edition, 
 Fiell, Peter; Fiell, Charlotte; Krumhauer, Julia, (2003). Industrial Design A-Z, Tashen, 
 Ogursky, Guenter; Stof, Gabrielle (editors) (Unknown). The Influence of Ergonomics on the Design of Power Tools, Robert Bosch GmbH, Stuttgart
 Godau, Marion; Antonelli, Paola, (2007) Design Directory Germany, Universe, 
 Marquart, Christian, (1994). Industrial Culture – Industrial Design: A Piece of German Economic and Design History: The Founder Members of the Association of German Industrial, John Wiley & Sons, 
 Zec, Prof. Peter, (1997). German Design Standards, Koln: DuMont,

External links
 TEAMS Design
 Paul Hatch on World Business Review Television series hosted by Alexander Haig
 35 Patents by Paul Hatch

British industrial designers
English designers
Living people
1969 births
People from Lichfield